The discography of Lydia, a Gilbert, AZ based indie rock band, consists of five studio albums, three EPs, three singles, and five music videos.

Studio albums

Extended plays

Singles

Music videos

Other appearances

Demos
Four Song Demo
 "Her and Haley" - 7:38
 "A Story for Supper" - 6:30
 "Only Something You Could Say" - 2:15
 "Such a Beautiful Dream" - 4:48
Re-recorded as "Fools and Luxury"

The Militia Group Demos
 "One" - 3:10
 "Two" - 4:12

References

Lydia